The Boys on the Bus (1973) is author Timothy Crouse's seminal non-fiction book detailing life on the road for reporters covering the 1972 United States presidential election.

The book was one of the first treatises on pack journalism ever to be published, following in the footsteps of Gay Talese's 1969 "fly on the wall" look into the New York Times called The Kingdom and the Power.  

The Boys on the Bus evolved out of several articles Crouse had written for Rolling Stone. When released, the book became a best-seller and is still in print today, often being used as a standard text in many university journalism courses. 

Several very recognizable reporters, whose bylines could be seen into the 21st century, are at turns critiqued, lampooned and glorified in the book, including R.W. "Johnny" Apple, Robert Novak, Walter Mears, Haynes Johnson, David Broder, Hunter S. Thompson, Thomas Oliphant, Curtis Wilkie, Carl Leubsdorf,  and Jules Witcover, not to mention the politicians they were covering:  Richard Nixon and George McGovern. Later editions of the book contain a foreword by Thompson.

See also
 Fear and Loathing on the Campaign Trail '72
 1972 United States presidential election

References

External links
Washington Post review

1973 non-fiction books
Books about journalism
Non-fiction books about elections
1972 United States presidential election
American political books